Wobulenzi is a municipality in Katikamu sub-county, in Luweero District in the Central Region of Uganda.

Location
The road is a busy, all-weather tarmac highway, referred to as the Kampala–Gulu Highway. The coordinates of the town are 0°43'12.0"N, 32°31'48.0"E (Latitude:0.7200; Longitude:32.5300).

Population
The 1991 national census enumerated 5,391 people in Wobulenzi. In 2002, the population that year put the town's population at 18,846. In 2014, the national population census and household survey put the population at 27,048.

In 2020, the Uganda Bureau of Statistics (UBOS), estimated the mid-year population of the town at 31,000 inhabitants. UBOS calculated that the population of Wobulenzi Town Council increased at an average rate of 2.36 percent annually between 2014 and 2020.

Points of interest
In Wobulenzi or near the town, there are several points of interest, including the following:(a) the offices of Wobulenzi Town Council (b) Centenary Bank maintains a branch in Wobulenzi (c) the Kampala–Gulu Highway passes through town in a general south to north direction and (d) the Ziroobwe–Wobulenzi Road ends in town at the highway to Gulu.

In 2005, the New Vision reported that the town was in the process of establishing a new, modern, improved Wobulenzi Town Market, valued at USh:800 million (approx. US$224,400 in 2021 money), with financial support from Movit Uganda Limited, a cosmetics company.

See also
 Luwero Triangle
 List of cities and towns in Uganda
 List of roads in Uganda

References

External links
 Luwero District Portal

Populated places in Central Region, Uganda
Cities in the Great Rift Valley
Luweero District